The 2019 BYU Cougars women's volleyball team represents Brigham Young University in the 2019 NCAA Division I women's volleyball season. The Cougars are led by fifth year head coach Heather Olmstead and play their home games at the Smith Fieldhouse. The Cougars are members of the WCC.

BYU comes off a season where they won the WCC regular season championship and once again participated in the NCAA Tournament before falling to Stanford in the national semifinal.

The Cougars would put together another impressive season with a 25-4 record. However two losses in conference play caused the Cougars to finish second in the WCC. The Cougars were granted an at-large bid to the NCAA Tournament and were given the #14 seed, allowing them to host the first two rounds. BYU would be swept by Utah in the 2nd Round to finish the season at 26-5. After the tournament was completed BYU finished ranked #17 in the nation.

Season highlights
Will be filled in as the season progresses.

Roster

Schedule

 *-Indicates Conference Opponent
 y-Indicates NCAA Playoffs
 Times listed are Mountain Time Zone.

Announcers for televised games
All home games will be on BYUtv or WCC Network (formerly TheW.tv). Most road game will also be televised or streamed. 
Boise State: Spencer Linton, Amy Gant, & Jason Shepherd
Utah Valley: Spencer Linton, Amy Gant, & Jason Shepherd
Marquette: Spencer Linton, Amy Gant, & Jason Shepherd
LIU: Royce Hinton
Sam Houston State: Royce Hinton
Weber State: Royce Hinton
Wichita State: Shane Dennis
Texas: Shane Dennis
VCU: Shane Dennis
Utah: Krista Blunk & Amy Gant
Stanford: Kate Scott & Rich Feller
Gonzaga: Connor Basch, Faith Smith, & 
Portland: Bryan Sleik
Loyola Marymount: Royce Hinton
Pacific: Paul Muyskens
Saint Mary's: Alex Jensen & Andy Schroeder
San Francisco: Jarom Jordan, Amy Gant, & Jason Shepherd
Santa Clara: Royce Hinton
San Diego: Spencer Linton, Amy Gant, & Jason Shepherd
Loyola Marymount: Betsi Flint & Sean/Shawn/Shaun Mare
Pepperdine: Al Epstein
Saint Mary's: Spencer Linton & Amy Gant
Pacific: Jarom Jordan & Amy Gant
Santa Clara: Anthony Passarelli
San Francisco: Pat Olson
San Diego: Jack Cronin
Portland: Royce Hinton
Gonzaga: Jarom Jordan & Amy Gant
Pepperdine: Paul Sunderland & Karch Kiraly
New Mexico State: Spencer Linton & Amy Gant
Utah: Spencer Linton & Amy Gant

References
For information on BYU's other fall and winter sports please check out the following:

2019 team
2019 in sports in Utah
BYU
BYU